WRC 4: FIA World Rally Championship is the official racing video game of the 2013 World Rally Championship season. It was developed by Milestone srl being the last WRC Videogame to be developed by Milestone. WRC 4 was released in Europe on 25 October 2013.

Per the calendar, Rally New Zealand was removed from the previous game, while Rallye Deutschland and Rally Mexico both had revised routes.

Reception

The game had mixed reviews. The general consensus is that "the career mode is a lot of fun and the tracks are varied. On the other hand, the game lacks challenge, has an overabundance of loading times and disappoints audiovisually." It got to number 21 in the UK sales charts.

References

External links
 

2013 video games
Milestone srl games
PlayStation 3 games
PlayStation Vita games
World Rally Championship video games
Windows games
Xbox 360 games
Video games developed in Italy
Multiplayer and single-player video games
Video games set in Argentina
Video games set in Australia
Video games set in Finland
Video games set in France
Video games set in Germany
Video games set in Greece
Video games set in Italy
Video games set in Mexico
Video games set in Monaco
Video games set in Spain
Video games set in Sweden
Video games set in Portugal
Video games set in Wales
Nacon games